Alfred Polond (February 29, 1872 – March 26, 1956) was a private serving in the United States Army during the Spanish–American War who received the Medal of Honor for bravery.

Biography
Polond was born February 29, 1872, in Lapeer, Michigan, and entered the army from his place of birth. He was sent to fight in the Spanish–American War with Company F, 10th U.S. Infantry as a private where he received the Medal of Honor for his actions.

He died March 26, 1956, and is buried in Riverside Cemetery Kalamazoo, Michigan. His grave can be found in section Q, lot 83, grave 11.

Medal of Honor citation
Rank and organization: Private, Company F, 10th U.S. Infantry. Place and date: At Santiago, Cuba, 1 July 1898. Entered service at: Lapeer, Mich. Birth: Lapeer, Mich. Date of issue: 22 June 1899.
Citation:

Gallantly assisted in the rescue of the wounded from in front of the lines and while under heavy fire of the enemy.

See also

List of Medal of Honor recipients for the Spanish–American War

References

External links

1872 births
1956 deaths
United States Army Medal of Honor recipients
United States Army soldiers
American military personnel of the Spanish–American War
People from Lapeer, Michigan
Burials in Michigan
Spanish–American War recipients of the Medal of Honor